Dave Mason & Cass Elliot was the only teaming of artists Dave Mason and Cass Elliot. The album was produced by both Mason and Elliot and recorded in 1970. The album was released by Mason's label, Blue Thumb Records.

Conception
After being introduced by their mutual friend Gram Parsons, Mason and Elliot hit it off and decided to pursue singing together professionally. Elliot, having released two solo albums at that time, missed the collaborative effort of producing music and Mason, who had just arrived in the U.S. after splitting with Traffic, was interested in a fresh collaboration. Originally Elliot was intended to be co-producer with Mason on an intended solo album by the latter: after Elliot sang background for Mason on some sessions the idea of the album being a Mason/ Elliot collaboration emerged.

Album
Despite receiving co-billing with Mason, on several of the songs Elliot's contributions are limited to background vocals, which highlighted a raspy, more raw side of Elliot’s voice. When interviewed by Rolling Stone magazine Elliot stated, "I sing better with David because he's so good. You want to do better. I'm singing notes I never sang with The Mamas & the Papas".

The music falls into the country rock harmony sound of its time, but with a bluesier edge. Mason wrote five of the songs on the album, while Elliot co-wrote two: the single "Something to Make You Happy" and her only solo song on the album, "Here We Go Again". This was the first time that Elliot lent her hand in songwriting since her days with The Big 3 and The Mugwumps, and also the last.

Dave Mason & Cass Elliot was recorded  - at the Record Plant West - in the autumn of 1970 for release by Blue Thumb Records, who had released Mason's debut album Alone Together: Dunhill Records, on whose roster Elliot was, held right of release to any singles from the album Dave Mason & Cass Elliot and also a second collaborative album from the two singers. Two singles were released from the album Dave Mason & Cass Elliot: "Something to Make You Happy" in January 1971, "Too Much Truth, Too Much Love" released the following month.

Reception

The album was released in March 1971 and was a moderate success landing at the 49th spot on the Billboard Top 200 chart. To promote the album, Mason and Elliot both appeared and performed on The Tonight Show and The Andy Williams Show. They also performed two concerts with the first one at the Santa Monica Civic Auditorium and the second at New York’s Fillmore East. Although Mason and Elliot remained close friends and both discussed interest in recording together again, this would be their only collaboration.

It was reissued in 2008 by the British Rev-Ola Records. Cherry Red Records reissued the CD in 2019 as CDMRED737.

Track listing

Personnel 
 Dave Mason - guitar, vocals
 Cass Elliot - vocals
 Bryan Garo - bass 
 Paul Harris - keyboards, strings 
 Russ Kunkel - drums, percussion 
Technical
 Dave Mason, Cass Elliot - producer
 Gary Kellgren - engineer

References

1971 albums
Pop rock albums
Cass Elliot albums
Dave Mason albums
Collaborative albums
Blue Thumb Records albums
Albums produced by Dave Mason
Albums produced by Cass Elliot